Queen of the West is a stern-driven paddle wheel riverboat originally built in 1995 at Nichols Bros. Boat Builders for the American West Steamboat Company for overnight river cruising on the Columbia & Snake Rivers within the United States.  She is currently owned and operated by American Cruise Lines.  The Queen of the West originally carried up to 167 passengers, but now carries 120 following her 2011 refurbishment for ACL.  The ship has 67 cabins spread over 4 decks.

On August 4, 2015, ACL announced that Queen of the West would be joined by her 150 passenger sister ship, American Pride, on the Columbia in early 2016.

See also
Tourist sternwheelers of Oregon

References

External links
 Mississippi Riverboat Cruises: Back in the Water for 2012 from Frommer's
 Official website

1995 ships
Cruise ships of the United States
Ships built in Washington (state)